Equipo Continental San Luis is an Argentinian UCI Continental cycling team founded in 2020.

Team roster

Major wins 
Stage 1 Vuelta a Formosa Internacional, Lucas Gaday

References

External links

UCI Continental Teams (America)
Cycling teams established in 2020
Cycling teams based in Argentina